Asthenotricha unipecten is a moth in the family Geometridae first described by Louis Beethoven Prout in 1915. It is found in the Democratic Republic of the Congo, Kenya, Malawi, São Tomé and Príncipe and Uganda.

References

Moths described in 1915
Asthenotricha
Moths of Africa
Moths of São Tomé and Príncipe